Dan Khla (เทศบาลตำบลด่านคล้า) is a sub-district municipality of Non Sung District, Nakhon Ratchasima Province, Thailand. It was created as a TAO in 1996 and upgraded to a municipality in 2008. It covers 29 km2, 14 villages and 8,567 citizens.

Thesaban of Nakhon Ratchasima Province